Melaleuca thymifolia, commonly known as thyme honey-myrtle, is a plant in the myrtle family Myrtaceae and is native to eastern Australia. It is often noticed in spring, with its attractive, purple flowers and is one of the most commonly cultivated melaleucas.

Description
Its leaves are arranged in alternating pairs (decussate) so that they make four rows of leaves along the stem.

The flowers are a shade between pink and deep purple and are arranged in heads, sometimes at the ends of branches which continue to grow after flowering, and sometimes on the sides of the branches. The stamens are arranged in five bundles around the flower, each bundle containing 30 to 60 curved stamens. Flowering occurs over a long period, mostly in spring but also at other times of the year. The fruit have five persistent teeth around the rim.

Taxonomy and naming
The species was first formally described in 1797 by the English botanist, James Smith in Transactions of the Linnean Society of London noting that "Mr. Fairbairn has presented flowering specimens of this species to the Linnaean Society from Chelsea garden." The specific epithet (thymifolia) is a reference to the similarity of the leaves of this species to the leaves of Thymus (thyme) in the family Lamiaceae.

Distribution and habitat
Melaleuca thymifolia occurs from Pigeon House Mountain in New South Wales, north to south eastern Queensland with a disjunct population in the Carnarvon Range in central Queensland. It grows in seasonal swamps and along creeks in a variety of soils.

Use in horticulture
Melaleuca thymifolia may be the most commonly cultivated of its genus because of its attractive flowers, graceful form and adaptability to a wide range of soils and condition.

A number of cultivars have been developed including Melaleuca thymifolia ‘Pink Lace and Melaleuca thymifolia ‘White Lace’

References

Flora of New South Wales
Flora of Queensland
thymifolia
Myrtales of Australia
Plants described in 1797